The Social Democratic Party-Dusabikanye (PSD-Dusabikanye) is a small progressive political party in Burundi.

Political parties in Burundi
Social democratic parties